Jonava is the ninth largest city in Lithuania with a population of .
It is served by Kaunas International Airport. Achema, the largest fertilizer factory in the Baltic states, is located nearby. The city is sometimes called "the capital of midsummer holiday" (lt. – Joninės).

History 
Jonava was officially established as a city in the 18th century during the times of the Polish–Lithuanian Commonwealth. In 1750, the first wooden church was built in Jonava. In 1778, a beer brewery was operating in the town. Around 1812, Napoleon and his army invaded the town and its surrounding villages. In 1923, Jonava was officially recognised as a city-status settlement and in 1950 it became the centre of the municipality.

The city had a large Jewish population before World War II - in 1893 92% of the population was Jewish and in 1941 it was 80%. In 1932 there were 250 shops owned by Jewish families, a Jewish bank, 7 synagogues and a Jewish school. During World War II Jonava was attacked by Nazi Germany. A Christian church and five Jewish synagogues were destroyed.  
The Jews of the city were killed in two massacres, in August and September 1941. A total of 2,108 people were executed by an Einsatzgruppen of Germans and Lithuanian Self-Defence Units. 200 remaining Jews were kept prisoners at the Kaunas ghetto.

After the war, the city built the largest fertilizer factory in the Baltic states and Jonava become one of the 4 biggest industrial cities in Lithuania.

Environmental catastrophe 
An explosion occurred in the chemical fertilizers factory on 20 March 1989, causing a leakage of nearly 7,500 tonnes of liquid ammonia. The catastrophe developed further into a fire within the nitrophosphate facility and fertilizer storehouses polluting the atmosphere with products of their combustion, such as nitrous oxide and chlorine.  The toxic cloud drifted towards Ukmergė, Širvintos and Kėdainiai. The concentration of ammonia surpassed the permissible level by a factor of 150 in Upninkai, at 10 km from the disaster site. One day after the accident, a toxic cloud 7 km wide and 50 km long was recorded between Jonava and Kėdainiai. Seven people died during the fire and leakage of ammonia immediately afterward, 29 people became handicapped, and a large number of people suffered from acute respiratory and cardiac attacks. The true extent of damages and health impact from the event is however unknown.  What is known is that exposure to ammonia prenatally, especially at a young age can cause serious brain damage.

Administrative divisions
Jonava is divided into 13 city regions:

Senamiestis
Girelė
Miškų ūkis
Paneriai
Lietava
Lakštingalos
Juodmena
Geležinkelio stotis
Baldininkai
Rimkai
Kosmonautai
Skaruliai
Virbalai

Demography

Historical population

Sport
The city has its own "physical culture and sports center" with stadium, swimming pool and indoor arena. It has already been announced that the city is going to build a new large indoor arena "BC Jonava".

Football

Jonava has 2 soccer teams
 FK Jonava is playing in the A Lyga – First Football Division of Lithuania
 FK Jonava B - second team of FK Jonava, playing in the Third Division of Lithuania

Athletics
The marathon runners sport club Maratonas won 4 medals at Vilnius Marathon.

Basketball
Jonava has a basketball team, founded in 1969; Jonava SK Malsta playing in the National Basketball League (Nacionalinė Krepšinio Lyga). There is also a women's basketball team called BC Jonava which won bronze medals in the women's Second Basketball Division (Nacionalinė moterų krepšinio lyga).

Volleyball
Jonava has a strong women's volleyball team Achema-KKSC that playing in the highest league A Grupė. In 2010 Jonava held the international "Alfredas Ogonauskas Memorial Volleyball Championship".

Competitions
Jonava also hosts some less regular competitions. During the traditional midsummer holiday there was "Jonas's Republic President Cup" of Rally Slalom events. In summer seasons there are some occasional cycling tournaments or cross country competitions.

Education

 Jonava adult education center
 Jonava Jeronimas Ralys Gymnasium
 Jonava Justinas Vareikis Progymnasium
 Jonava Lietava comprehensive school
 Jonava Neris comprehensive school
 Jonava Raimundas Samulevičius Progymnasium
 Jonava Old Town Gymnasium
 Janina Miščiukaitė art school

Twin towns — sister cities

Jonava is twinned with:

 Děčín, Czech Republic
 Jõgeva, Estonia
 Kędzierzyn-Koźle, Poland
 Riihimäki, Finland
 Pucioasa, Romania
 Smila, Ukraine
 Vadul lui Vodă, Moldova
 Zugdidi, Georgia

Notable residents
 Linas Balčiūnas, (born 1978), olympic cyclist
 Arnoldas Burkovskis (born 1967), manager
 Vydas Dolinskas, (born 1970), art scientist
 Israel Davidson (1870-1939), writer
 Dominykas Galkevičius (born 1986), footballer
 S. J. Goldsmith (1915–1995), journalist and editor
 Laurynas Gucevičius, architect
 Andrius Janukonis, (born 1971), businessman
 Grigorijus Kanovičius, (born 1929), Jewish writer
 Dainius Kreivys, (born 1970), politician,  Minister of Economy
 Juozapas Antanas Kosakovskis, general, Napoleon aide
 Darius Maskoliūnas, (born 1971), basketball player
 Abra Abrahamas Meirsonas, Harvard professor of neurosurgery
 Janina Miščiukaitė (1948–2008), singer
 Abraham Myerson, (1881-1948), neurologist, psychiatric, sociologist
 Jeronimas Ralys (1876–1921), translator and medic
 Ričardas Tamulis (1938–2008), boxer
 Artūras Zuokas, (born 1968), businessman, former Vilnius mayor

Gallery

See also
Jonava Bridge
Jonava Market

References

External links

 Jonava Web Page
 Portal of Jonava
 Jewish history of Jonava
 Article on occasion of the 20th anniversary of ecologic catastrophe in Jonava fertilizers factory
 

 
Cities in Kaunas County
Cities in Lithuania
Jonava District Municipality
Municipalities administrative centres of Lithuania
Kovensky Uyezd
Shtetls
Holocaust locations in Lithuania